David Scott Serrano is a former American baseball coach and pitcher. Serrano formerly served as head coach at Cerritos College from 1984 to 1985 and at California State University, Fullerton from 1986 to 1987 for coach Augie Garrido. He served as the head coach at University of California, Irvine from 2005 to 2007,  Cal State Fullerton from 2008 to 2011, the University of Tennessee from 2012 to 2017 and CSU Northridge from 2020–2022.

Playing career
Serrano graduated from Cerritos High School in 1982 and pitched two seasons at Cerritos College. He went 12–1 and earned JC All-American honors in 1985 while leading the Falcons to a 39–5 record and a state championship. Serrano then pitched for Cal State Fullerton in 1986, recording a 3–4 mark with one save in 15 appearances. He earned his bachelor's degree from Trinity College and University (now Bronte International University), an unaccredited institution.

Coaching career
He began his coaching career as an assistant to George Horton at Cerritos College in 1988. He succeeded Horton for the 1991 season after Horton left to become associate head coach to Augie Garrido at Cal State Fullerton. Serrano returned to assistant coaching duties for 1992–94 for the Falcons before going to Tennessee, where he served two seasons as pitching coach for Rod Delmonico. The Volunteers went 97–36 and made their first trip to Omaha in 44 years in 1995, when they were twice routed by Fullerton's third national championship team.

Serrano would become the pitching coach and recruiting coordinator for former Titan head coach Horton and the Titans for the 1997 through 2004 seasons.
During Serrano's 8-year tenure at Fullerton, the Titans went 356–154–1 (.698) and were in the NCAA Tournament every season. They won six Big West Conference championships, four NCAA Regionals and four NCAA Super Regionals to earn four trips to Omaha. In 2004, he was named the ABCA/Baseball America Assistant Coach of the Year.

Every one of Serrano's Fullerton recruiting classes was ranked in the nation's Top 20. He also has nurtured a long list of pitchers who went on to play professionally, including Chad Cordero. He tutored six conference pitchers of the year and of the 25 All-American players at Fullerton during his tenure, 15 were pitchers.

He left after the Titans' fourth national championship to become head coach at UC Irvine, where he compiled a 114–66–1 (.633) record over three seasons and took the Anteaters to their first College World Series appearance in 2007. Their 47–17–1 season earned Serrano national coach of the year honors from Baseball America, which had ranked him as the nation's top assistant coach in 2004 with the Titans. He developed three more All-American pitchers at UCI.

Serrano took over the Fullerton State Titans baseball team in 2008. He led the Titans to the NCAA tournament every year that he served as head coach. He also helped guide the Titans to the College World Series in 2009. Serrano's teams went on to play in Super Regionals in each of his first three seasons with Fullerton. The 2008, 2010, and 2011 Titans teams won the Big West Conference Championships. He compiled an overall record of 175–73 in his four seasons with the Titans.

Serrano was announced as the Tennessee Volunteers baseball head coach on June 15, 2011, replacing Todd Raleigh. He did not have a winning record in conference play in six seasons with the Vols.  He resigned at the end of the Volunteers' 2017 season. 

On July 3, 2017, Serrano was named the West Virginia Mountaineers' pitching coach.  WVU and Serrano had a "mutual parting of ways" after one season.  

On June 24, 2019, Serrano was named the head coach for the Cal State Northridge Matadors. On January 25, 2022, Serrano announced his retirement from coaching,  effective end of season.

Head coaching record

Personal
He and his second wife, Tracy, have three sons: Kyle, Zachary, and Parker.  Kyle played for Dave at Tennessee.

References

External links
 Biography at utsports.com

1964 births
Living people
Cal State Fullerton Titans baseball coaches
Cal State Fullerton Titans baseball players
Cerritos Falcons baseball coaches
Tennessee Volunteers baseball coaches
UC Irvine Anteaters baseball coaches
Cerritos Falcons baseball players
West Virginia Mountaineers baseball coaches